Qareh Aghaj (also Romanized as Qareh Āghāj; also known as Kara-Agach, Qara Aghach, Qarah Āqāj, Qareh Āqāch, and Qareh Āqāj) is a village in Zanjanrud-e Pain Rural District, Zanjanrud District, Zanjan County, Zanjan Province, Iran. At the 2006 census, its population was 384, in 99 families.

References 

Populated places in Zanjan County